Richard Pool-Jones (born 22 October 1969) is an English former rugby union player and current coach. He earned one cap for England in 1998, playing in the record 76-0 loss to Australia. Pool-Jones, who played club rugby in France for Biarritz Olympique and Stade Français, played for the latter in the 2001 Heineken Cup Final.

After retiring from rugby, Pool-Jones began a media career in France. During the 2011 Rugby World Cup, he co-hosted a radio show with Vincent Moscato and Sébastien Chabal. He also served as a vice-president at Stade Français, and was credited with helping broker a deal that saved the club from bankruptcy before the 2011–12 season.

In May 2012, he was named the new head coach of Stade Français, replacing Michael Cheika.

Honours
 Stade Français
French Rugby Union Championship/Top 14: 1997–98, 1999–2000

References

1969 births
Living people
England international rugby union players
English rugby union coaches
English rugby union players
Rugby union players from London
Stade Français coaches